Orizzonti is a section of the Venice Film Festival's official selection. It runs as a parallel section to the main competition for the Golden Lion.

Orizzonti winners

Other Orizzonti awards

References

External links
 The Venice Film Festival at the IMDb

Italian film awards
Lists of films by award
Venice Film Festival